This is a list of prefects of Krapina-Zagorje County.

Prefects of Krapina-Zagorje County (1993–present)

See also
Krapina-Zagorje County

Notes

External links
World Statesmen - Krapina-Zagorje County

Krapina-Zagorje County